Melilotus sulcatus, the furrowed melilot or Mediterranean sweetclover, is a species of the genus Melilotus, belonging to the pea family; Fabaceae or Papilionaceae.

It is distributed in Southern Europe, an annual plant between 10 and 40 cm high. The stem leaves are grooved. The flowers are very small; 3-5mm.long, in bloom  from June until August. The pods are 3–3.5mm. long, with bowline veins.

References

Trifolieae
Taxa named by René Louiche Desfontaines
Flora of Malta